Sint Eustatius has 119 protected buildings.

Protected Buildings
Protected Buildings